Stanislav Rabotov (born 14 June 2002) is a Bulgarian professional footballer who plays as a defender for Botev Plovdiv.

Career statistics

References

External links
 

2002 births
Living people
Bulgarian footballers
First Professional Football League (Bulgaria) players
Botev Plovdiv players
Association football defenders
People from Rakovski